Pelican / Mono is a split album by the Japanese band Mono and the American band Pelican. The 4,000 copies of this LP that were produced are limited to vinyl. In December 2005, American webzine Somewhere Cold voted Pelican / Mono Vinyl Release of the Year on their 2005 Somewhere Cold Awards Hall of Fame list.

Track listing

References

Post-metal albums
Mono (Japanese band) albums
Pelican (band) albums
Split EPs
2005 EPs
Hydra Head Records EPs